Paracambi is a municipality located in the Brazilian state of Rio de Janeiro. Its population was 52,683 (2020) and its area is 179 km².

Notable births
 Maicon Santos, professional football player

References

Municipalities in Rio de Janeiro (state)